John Isaac Davis  (born April 8, 1972) is a former American football guard in the National Football League.  He played for the San Diego Chargers, New Orleans Saints and the Minnesota Vikings. Davis attended the University of Arkansas, and was named to Arkansas' All-Decade Team for the 1990s

High school and college years
Davis was an All-State performer at Malvern High School, playing on both the offensive and defensive line.  He accepted a scholarship offer to play for the University of Arkansas under then-head coach Ken Hatfield, where he became strictly an offensive lineman.  Davis was named Third-team All-American and First-team All-SEC following both his junior and senior seasons.

Professional football career

NFL
Isaac Davis was taken in the second round (43rd pick) of the 1994 NFL Draft by the San Diego Chargers, going ahead of such notable players as Larry Allen, Jason Sehorn, and Jason Gildon.  Davis, who started for the Chargers in Super Bowl XXIX, played in 58 games over a six-year career, starting 31 times.  In addition to games played for the Chargers and the Saints, Davis was briefly a member of the Minnesota Vikings during the 1998 season, but did not see any game action.  In 1999, Davis was signed as a free agent by the Oakland Raiders, but he failed to make the regular season roster.

XFL
Davis was selected with the 165th pick of the XFL Draft, but was traded to the Chicago Enforcers.  He was then traded during the pre-season to the Memphis Maniax for quarterback Craig Whelihan, making him part of the first trade in league history.

Personal life
Isaac Davis is currently an assistant football coach at Parkview Arts and Science Magnet High School, where he is also a special education teacher.
Davis and his wife have 4 daughters.  He also has a son, who is currently (2016) playing for Arkansas State University, from a previous marriage..  He is a member of Phi Beta Sigma fraternity. Davis served as the Honorary Captain for the Razorbacks' game against LSU during the 2010 season.

References

External links
Just Sports Stats

1972 births
Living people
Chicago Enforcers players
American football offensive guards
Arkansas Razorbacks football players
Las Vegas Outlaws (XFL) players
Malvern High School (Arkansas) alumni
Memphis Maniax players
New Orleans Saints players
People from Malvern, Arkansas
Players of American football from Arkansas
San Diego Chargers players